Rail transport in Japan is a major means of passenger transport, especially for mass and high-speed travel between major cities and for commuter transport in urban areas. It is used relatively little for freight transport, accounting for just 0.84% of goods movement. The privatised network is highly efficient, requiring few subsidies and running with extreme punctuality.

Overview
Rail transport services in Japan are provided by more than 100 private companies, including
 Six Japan Railways Group (JR) regional companies (state owned until 1987) which provide passenger services to most parts of Hokkaido, Honshu, Shikoku, and Kyushu; 
 The nationwide JR freight company; and
 16 major regional companies which provide railway services as part of their corporate operations. There are also dozens of smaller local private railways.

Many of the private rail companies rank among the top corporations in the country. Railways were built by private corporations developing integrated communities along the railway lines, allowing them to achieve profitability by diversifying into real estate, retail, and numerous other businesses. These rail integrated communities are a form of transit oriented development unique to the rail system in Japan. Rail integrated communities increase walkability in these urban spaces. As they are to be used by pedestrians, they include sidewalks and bikeways. Regional governments, and companies funded jointly by regional governments and private companies, also provide rail service.

There are 30,625 km of rail crisscrossing the country. JR (a group of companies formed after privatization of JNR) controlled 20,135 km of these lines as of March 31, 1996, with the remaining 7,133 km in the hands of private enterprise local railway companies. Japan's railways carried 9.147 billion passengers (260 billion passenger-kilometres) in the year 2013–14. In comparison, Germany has over 40,000 km of railways, but carries only 2.2 billion passengers per year. Because of the massive use of its railway system, Japan is home to 46 of the world's 50 busiest stations.

The major usage is of urban and intercity lines, and around the time of the privatisation of JNR, many unprofitable local and rural lines were closed, especially in Hokkaido and Kyushu. However, with patronage on many non-urban local lines continuing to decline due to factors such as rising levels of car ownership and declining rural populations, further closures are planned. For example, On October 16, 2015, JR West announced that it was considering closing the 108 km Sanko Line due to poor patronage, and was in discussion with the two prefectures served by the line, Shimane and Hiroshima, as well as other municipalities served, concerning future plans. In fiscal 2014, the line carried an average of 50 passengers per km per day, compared to 458 per km per day in 1987. The entire line closed on March 31, 2018.

On November 19, 2016, JR Hokkaido's President announced plans to further rationalise its network by up to 1,237 km, or ~50% of the current network, including closure of the remaining section of the Rumoi Main Line (the Rumoi - Mashike section closed on December 4, 2016), the Shin-Yubari - Yubari section of the Sekisho Line, the non-electrified section of the Sassho Line and the Nemuro Line between Furano and Kami-Ochiai Junction. Other lines including the Sekihoku Main Line, Senmo Main Line, the Nayoro - Wakkanai section of the Soya Line and Kushiro - Nemuro section of the Nemuro Line are proposed for conversion to Third Sector operation, but if local governments are not agreeable, such sections will also face closure.

Fukuoka, Kobe, Kyoto, Nagoya, Osaka, Sapporo, Sendai, Tokyo and Yokohama have subway systems. However, unlike Europe, the vast majority of passenger traffic is on suburban commuter trains that criss-cross metropolitan areas. In addition, many cities have streetcar and monorail networks.

Japan pioneered the high-speed shinkansen or "bullet train", which now links Japan's largest cities at speeds of up to 320 km/h (200 mph). However, other trains running on the conventional line or "zairaisen" remain relatively slow, operating at fastest 160 km/h and mostly under 130 km/h, most likely due to the wide usage of Narrow-gauge tracks they operate on.

Japan's railways carried 31 million tons (21 billion tonne-kilometres) of goods in 2013–14. The share of railways in the national logistics is as small as 6.2% (2010), by far the lowest in the G8.

History

Railways are the most important means of passenger transportation in Japan, maintaining this status since the late nineteenth century. Government policy promoted railways as an efficient transportation system for a country that lacks fossil fuels and is nearly completely dependent on imports.

Rural land near large cities was acquired cheaply by private railway companies from the late nineteenth century, which then built lines that became the backbone of urban transport between the suburbs and cities formed around the railway lines radiating out from metropolitan areas, similar to suburban growth around railways in other nations.

Despite this efficiency, growing affluence and associated car ownership led to road transportation usage increasing to the detriment of rail from the 1960s. The relative share of railways in total passenger kilometers fell from 66.7 percent in 1965 to 42 percent in 1978, and 29.8 percent in 1990, although this still accounted for the largest percentage of the OECD member countries.

The figure is 43.5% (as of 2001) in the largest metropolitan areas in Japan: Tokyo (including Chiba, Saitama, Tokyo, and Kanagawa Prefectures), Osaka (including Kyoto, Osaka, and Hyōgo Prefectures), and Nagoya. Private automobiles in Greater Tokyo account for less than 20% of daily trips as car ownership is restricted to those with a dedicated parking space.

Timeline
1872 - Opening of Japan's first railway between Shinbashi (Tokyo) and Yokohama by Masaru Inoue
1881 - Foundation of Nippon Railway, Japan's first private railway company
1882 - Opening of Horonai Railway, first railway in Hokkaido
1888 - Opening of Iyo Railway, first railway in Shikoku
1889 - Opening of Kyushu Railway, first railway in Kyushu
1889 - Completion of the Tōkaidō Main Line
1893 - Class 860 steam locomotive, first locomotive built in Japan
1895 - Opening of Japan's first streetcar in Kyoto
1895 - Japan's acquisition of railway in Taiwan
1899 - Opening of Keijin Railway, first railway in Korea
1906 - Opening of first railway in Karafuto
1906 - Foundation of South Manchuria Railway
1906-1907 - Nationalization of 17 private railways
1914 - Opening of Tokyo Station
1925 - Inauguration of the Yamanote Line
1927 - Opening of Tokyo subway, the first subway in the East
1942 - Opening of Kanmon Tunnel connecting Honshu and Kyushu
1945 - End of World War II; railways were severely damaged
1949 - At the behest of the Supreme Commander for the Allied Powers, Japanese Government Railways (JGR) was reorganized to become a state-owned public corporation named the Japanese National Railways (JNR)
1956 - Completion of electrification of the Tōkaidō Main Line
1958 - Kodama, the first EMU express between Tokyo and Osaka
1960 - Hatsukari, the first DMU express between Ueno (Tokyo) and Aomori
1964 - Opening of the first Shinkansen line between Tokyo and Shin-Osaka
1975 - Retirement of steam locomotives from all JNR services (switchers remained until 1976)
1980 - Enactment of JNR Reconstruction Act; low-profit lines were to be abandoned
1987 - Privatization of the JNR; the Japan Railways Group companies succeeded the former JNR.
1988 - Opening of Seikan Tunnel connecting Honshu and Hokkaido
1988 - Opening of Great Seto Bridge connecting Honshu and Shikoku

Classifications of rail transport in Japan

Types of operators

JR

The Japan Railways Group, more commonly known as JR Group, is a group of successors of the government-owned Japanese National Railways (JNR). The JR Group lies at the heart of Japan's railway network, operating almost all intercity rail services and a large proportion of commuter rail services.

The six passenger operating companies of the JR Group are separated by region, but many operate long-distance train services beyond their regional boundaries. The six companies are: Hokkaido Railway Company, East Japan Railway Company, Central Japan Railway Company, West Japan Railway Company, Shikoku Railway Company, and Kyushu Railway Company.

Freight service belongs to Japan Freight Railway Company or JR Freight which operates all freight network previously owned by JNR.

Major private railways
Japan also features multiple competing private railway systems. In post-war Japan, the Japanese government encouraged private corporations to develop their own mass transit systems in order to quickly rebuild the country's urban transport networks.

Private rail lines were encouraged to compete with each other as well as the national rail lines with the government's role limited to regulation of fares. In exchange for developing rail lines, private corporations were given business opportunities to diversify their operations and develop the real estate surrounding their railway networks.

By allowing private corporations to control transit oriented developments as well as railway lines, planned communities were facilitated allowing private railway operators to establish a vertically integrated business of developing residential, business, industrial and retail land and the commuting methods used by the populace to travel between such areas.

As such, through diversification of their business, the majority of the private railways in Japan are financially independent and their railway operations are usually profitable, in sharp contrast to most transit networks in other countries.

The  classifies the following 16 companies as the major private railways and are operating 2,870.1 kilometers of railways. In a one-year period from April 2009, a total of 9.46 billion passengers (118 billion passenger kilometers) traveled on these major railways.
 Tobu Railway
 Seibu Railway
 Keisei Electric Railway
 Keio Corporation
 Odakyu Electric Railway
 Tokyu Corporation
 Keikyu Corporation
 Tokyo Metro
 Sotetsu
 Meitetsu
 Kintetsu Railway
 Nankai Electric Railway
 Keihan Electric Railway
 Hankyu Corporation
 Hanshin Electric Railway
 Nishitetsu

Other railways
Other railway operators include:
 City governments,
 "Third sector" companies funded jointly by regional governments and private companies.
 Other minor private railway companies.

Railway and tram
Every public rail transportation system under government regulation in Japan is classified either as railway or tramway. In principle, tramways can have sections shared with road traffic while railways cannot, but the choice may seem rather arbitrary in certain cases. For example, Osaka Metro is a tram system while subways in other cities are railways.

Categories of railway
Under the Railway Business Act, operations of "railways" (in the legal meaning) are divided into three categories: Category 1, Category 2 and Category 3.
They are defined by the Act as follows:

 : the business of transportation of passengers or freight by railway (except tramways) other than a Category 2 Railway Business operator.
: the business of the transportation of passengers or freight using railway tracks other than those constructed by the operator of the business (including the railway tracks constructed by others which were assigned to the operator) to meet the needs of others.
 : the business of constructing railway tracks for the purpose of assigning them to a Category 1 Railway Business operator and the business of constructing railway tracks to have a Category 2 Railway Business operator use them exclusively.

Most railway operations in Japan are Category 1. Examples of Category 2 railway businesses include most operations of the Japan Freight Railway Company (JR Freight) and the JR Tōzai Line operation of the West Japan Railway Company (JR West). Examples of Category 3 railway businesses include the Kōbe Rapid Transit Railway company and the government of Aomori Prefecture with regards to the Aoimori Railway.

Common features of Japanese railways

Gauge
The rail system of Japan consists of the following (as of 2009):
Used mainly for general passenger and freight lines.
Used mainly for high-speed lines, subway lines, and some suburban lines.
Used mainly for Keiō Line branches and regional tram systems. (See 1372 mm gauge railways in Japan).
(See 2 ft 6 in gauge railways in Japan).

The national railway network was started and has been expanded with the narrow  gauge. Railways with broader gauge are limited to those built not intending to provide through freight and passenger transport with the existing national network. The Shinkansen network uses standard gauge. Recently, a  standard gauge freight railway network (partially electrified with 25 kV AC) is proposed for Hokkaido, Honshu and the northernmost Kyushu (Kanmon strait - Hakata).

Electrification

Electrification systems used by the JR Group are 1,500 V DC and 20 kV AC for conventional lines, and 25 kV AC for Shinkansen. Electrification with 600 V DC and 750 V DC are also seen in private lines. Frequency of AC power supply is 50 Hz in eastern Japan and 60 Hz in western Japan.

Loading gauge
These include the Chūō Main Line west of Takao, the Minobu Line, and the Yosan Main Line west of Kan'onji ( height). Nevertheless, advances in pantograph technology have largely eliminated the need for separate rolling stock in these areas.

There are many private railway companies in Japan and the loading gauge is different for each company.

Railway links to Adjacent countries
Russia: proposed fixed link, break-of-gauge / (with 25 kV 50 Hz AC) in the northern Hokkaido. (see Sakhalin-Hokkaido Tunnel)
China: proposed trainferries from Hakata to Shanghai, and from Shimonoseki to Dalian.
United States: proposed trainferry from Kushiro to Seattle.
Canada: proposed trainferry from Kushiro to Vancouver.
South Korea: proposed trainferry from Sasebo to Busan.

Tickets, fare and surcharges

Rail transport in Japan is usually for a fee. In principle a fare is pre-charged and a ticket is issued in exchange for a payment of fare. A ticket is inspected at a staffed or automated gate in the station where a travel starts and is collected at the station where the travel ends.

The fare ticket is valid regardless of number of transfers. Long-distance travellers (usually longer than 101 km) are allowed unlimited number of  along the route subject to the duration of the validity of the fare ticket.

Except for very short railways and some tram systems with a flat fare, fare varies by distances or number of zones travelled. The pricing based on the time of travel (peak or off-peak) is not common in Japan.  for children between 6 and 12 is half of adult fare. Recent development in the fare collection system is the stored-value card systems shared by multiple operators in large cities, such as Suica, Pasmo and PiTaPa, by which passengers can avoid consultation with complicated fare tables and lineups for ticket machines before each train ride.

There are many types of surcharges. For example, in JR, surcharges include:
 for travel on an "express train"
 for travel on a reserved seat of a "limited express train"
 for travel on a non-reserved seat of a "limited express train"
 for travel on a reserved seat of trains except for a "limited express train"
 for travel on a special coach called "Green Car"
 for travel on a sleeping car

An unusual feature of Japanese surcharges, compared with other train systems, is that they often require a separate ticket. Thus, if riding the shinkansen, for instance, rather than purchasing a single shinkansen ticket, one purchases two tickets: a fare ticket (乗車券) for the distance traveled, and an additional  to allow one to ride the shinkansen for that distance, rather than ordinary trains. Since express trains are not separated by special gates from ordinary trains, express service requires manual inspection of tickets by a conductor, and express tickets can be purchased from the conductor. However, an increasing number of gates can now accept both fare and express tickets. In short, the fare ticket allows access to the train platforms at entrance and exit, where it is inspected by the gate or attendant at the station, while the express ticket allows one to ride an express train over the interval and is inspected by a conductor on the train.

Types and names of trains

Suburban or intercity railway lines usually set several  with different stop patterns.

Only a fare ticket is required to ride local trains. Railways with many types of trains use prefixes like "semi-", "rapid-", "section-", or "commuter-". For example, the Tōbu Isesaki Line has Local, Section Semi-Express, Semi-Express, Section Express, Express, Rapid, Section Rapid, and Limited Express.

Train operators usually name long-distance trains (Kintetsu is a rare exception of this practice). The process of ticket reservation utilizes the train names instead of the train numbers. Train numbers are almost exclusively for professional use.

Railway lines

All the railway and tram lines in Japan are named by the operators. In principle (with some exceptions), a section of railway has only one name. Line names are shown on a ticket to indicate the route of the ticket. Passengers refer the railway by the name of line (e.g. "Tōyoko Line") or the name of operator (e.g. "Hanshin").

The line names may come from a name of destination or a city along the line (e.g. the "Takasaki Line" goes to Takasaki, Gunma); a name of region (e.g. the "Tōhoku Main Line" goes through the Tōhoku region); an abbreviation of provinces or cities (e.g. the "Gonō Line" connects Goshogawara and Noshiro); or a course of the line (e.g. the "Tōzai Line" means the East-West Line).

Line names were used as a basis for the restructuring of JNR in the 1980s. The railway business was evaluated line-by-line in order to identify significantly unprofitable lines for closure. This left some unnamed branch lines, which would have been closed if they had line names, unaffected by the restructure.

In some cases the current route of a railway has changed but the historic line name has not reflected the change, in which case the operational name will be different from the original line name. Examples include the Keihin-Tōhoku Line and the Shōnan-Shinjuku Line.

Subways and light rail transit

In addition to its extensive railway network, Japan has a large number of subway systems. The largest is the Tokyo subway, where the network in 1989 consisted of 211 kilometers of track serving 205 stations. Two subway systems serve the capital: one run by the Tokyo Metro (named Teito Rapid Transit Authority until 2004), with nine lines (the oldest, Ginza line was built in 1927), and the other operated by the Tokyo metropolitan government's Transportation Bureau (Toei), with four lines. Outlying and suburban areas are served by seven private railway companies, whose lines intersect at major stations with the subway system. More than sixty additional kilometers of subway were under construction in 1990 by the two companies.

There are a number of other metro systems in other Japanese cities, including the Fukuoka City Subway, Kobe Municipal Subway, Kyoto Municipal Subway, Osaka Metro, Nagoya Subway, Sapporo Subway, Sendai Subway and Yokohama Subway.

While metro systems in Japanese cities are usually operated by the city government and therefore tend to limit their networks within the city border, there are many cases of through services using subway trains on suburban railway lines and vice versa. One of the reasons for this situation was the sharp increase of ridership on the railways in the rapid growth of the postwar economy that could not be handled by small original railway terminals in the city center.

Automated guideway transit (rubber-tired motor cars running on concrete guideways) has also developed in Japan. Cities with such intermediate capacity transit systems include Hiroshima, Kobe, Osaka, Saitama and Tokyo.

Some cities operate streetcar systems, including Hiroshima, Matsuyama, Nagasaki, Tokyo (one line only) and Toyohashi. All of these cities are also well served by public and private railroads; also, there are private tramways not included above.

In Japanese culture

Punctuality
Japanese railways are among the most punctual in the world. The average delay on the Tokaido Shinkansen in fiscal 2018 was 0.7 minutes. When trains are delayed for five minutes, the conductor makes an announcement apologizing for the delay and the railway company may provide a "delay certificate" (遅延証明書). Japanese passengers rely heavily on rail transit and take it for granted that trains operate on time. When trains are delayed for an hour or more, it may even appear in the newspaper. However, some argue that railway staff are under too much pressure from the public. These stringent standards are considered contributors to the cause of serious accidents such as the Amagasaki rail crash in 2005.

Trains and crime

One of the most widely publicized crimes committed on trains is chikan or groping, taking advantage of overcrowded cars and a reluctance for people to ask for help, or to jump to the aid of another. A recent trend for railway companies to promote their lines is to service female-only cars on some trains (typically during morning rush-hours and late night trains, and often the front or back car) and is quickly becoming a standard practice, especially among Tokyo's busy commuter lines.

The Japanese language has a number of expressions for fare evasion. One is Satsuma-no-kami. It is a reference to Taira Satsuma-no-kami Tadanori, a member of the Taira clan who is mentioned in the Tale of the Heike. His name, Tadanori, is pronounced the same as words meaning "riding for free".

Another expression is kiseru jōsha. This refers to a kiseru, a smoking pipe that has a long hollow section made of bamboo between the bowl (where the smoke enters) and the mouthpiece (where it leaves) made of metal. Based on an association of metal and money, kiseru jōsha is the practice of using one ticket to enter the train system and a different ticket to exit, with a long unpaid segment in the middle – purchasing two separate tickets, covering just the initial and final segments of the journey (corresponding to the bowl and mouthpiece), rather than one ticket for the whole length.

Other notable crimes staged in railway facilities in Japan include the assassination of the Prime Minister Hara Takashi in Tokyo Station in 1921, the deliberate train wreck at Mitaka Station in 1949 and the Sarin gas attack on the Tokyo subway in 1995.

Suicides

Trains are also used as a means to commit suicide. Its relative popularity is partly due to its practical ease, and to avoid causing a nuisance to one's family, although families are often charged or sued by the railway companies to compensate for the trouble caused by the accident. Suicides often cause delays on the lines on which they occur. The deceased's family may be charged damages on the order of approximately 1 million yen by railway operating companies. Railroad operators have taken steps to discourage and prevent suicides. This includes use of blue LED lights in stations, which officials hope will calm potential jumpers. Platform edge doors are also being installed at numerous stations in an effort to keep people contained on the platform until the train arrives.

Ekiben

An important aspect of the romance of the rails in Japan is the ekiben, the station bento lunchbox. The first pre-packed station lunchboxes originated at Utsunomiya Station in 1885 and became an instant success. Many stations (eki) around the country soon began to make special bento featuring local specialties such as seafood, meat or vegetables. Including generous portions of rice, the ekiben was a complete meal. It was often served in a wooden box; nowadays cardboard and plastics have become popular, although wooden chopsticks still accompany the ekiben. The Central Committee of the Japanese Association of Railroad Station Concessionaires (社団法人日本鉄道構内営業中央会) is a prominent trade organization promoting ekiben.

In media
Japanese books and television feature rail transport in various contexts. Examples include travelogues visiting rustic routes or unusual trains, such as the popular Sci-Fi franchise Galaxy Express 999 or murder mysteries on sleeper trains.

A major television series based on rail transport, Ressha Sentai ToQger, was broadcast on TV Asahi from 2014 to 2015.

Densha de Go! is a series of Japanese train simulators.

See also
List of urban rail systems in Japan
List of railway companies in Japan
List of railway lines in Japan
List of railway stations in Japan
List of railway electrification systems in Japan
Japanese railway signals
Monorails in Japan
List of defunct railway companies in Japan
Transport in Japan

References

Further reading
 Daito, Eisuke. "Railways and scientific management in Japan 1907–30." Business History 31.1 (1989): 1-28.
 Ericson, Steven J. The Sound of the Whistle: Railroads and the State in Meiji Japan (Harvard Univ Asia Center, 1996).
 Kinzley, W. Dean. "Merging Lines: Organising Japan's National Railroad, 1906-1914" Journal of Transport History 27#2 (2006)
 illustrated description of the development of Japanese railways to 1936

External links

 Trains in Japan
 Japanese Bullet Trains
 History of the Bullet Trains
 Train Tickets in Japan